Karaitivu may refer to 

 Karaitivu (Ampara), a town in Ampara District, Sri Lanka
 Karaitivu (Jaffna), an island in Jaffna District, Sri Lanka
 Karaitivu (Puttalam), a village in Puttalam District, Sri Lanka